A. marginata may refer to:
 Aganosma marginata, a liana species found in eastern Asia
 Alaria marginata, a brown alga species
 Anisoptera marginata, a plant species found in Sumatra, Peninsular Malaysia and Borneo
 Artanthe marginata, a synonym for Piper marginatum, the cake bush, Anesi wiwiri, marigold pepper, Ti Bombé in Creole or Hinojo, a plant species found in moist, shady spots in the Amazon rainforest in Surinam, French Guiana and Brazil
Archachatina marginata, a species of giant African snail.

See also